Ahmad Benali (born 7 February 1992) is a professional footballer who plays as a central midfielder for Italian  club Bari. Born in England, he represents Libya at international level.

Club career

Manchester City

Benali started his career in the youth team of Manchester City since joining the club at eight, and signed his first professional contract on his 17th birthday. While at the Manchester City youth team, Benali was given the captaincy.

On 31 August 2011, Benali was loaned out to League One club Rochdale, along with his former teammate David Ball, until 1 January 2012. After being absent from the first team for a month, Benali made his Rochdale debut on 4 October 2011, where he made his first start and played 72 minutes, in a 1–1 draw against Scunthorpe United in the second round of the Football League Trophy and progressed through to the next round after winning 3–1 in the penalty shoot–out. Benali then made his league debut eleven days later on 15 October 2011, where he provided assist for Gary Jones, in a 2–2 draw against Colchester United. After making two appearances for Rochdale, Benali returned to his parent club in late–December when it came to an end.

At the end of the 2011–12 season, Benali was released by Manchester City following his end to his contract. By the time he was released, Benali made no appearances for the club.

Brescia

After leaving Manchester City, Benali played abroad for the first time when he moved to Italy to join the Serie B club Brescia in the summer of 2012.

Benali made his Brescia Calcio debut, where he played 77 minutes, in a 2–1 loss against Cremonese in the second round of Coppa Italia. Benali made his league debut for Brescia debut, where he came on as a substitute in the 88th minute, in a 4–2 loss against Novara Calcio. Benali went on to make nine appearances in his first season at Brescia, with injuries restricted his appearance.

In the 2013–14 season, Benali managed to regain his first team place at the club and scored his first goal of the season, in a 4–1 win over Cittadella on 19 October 2013. Then on 9 November 2014, Benali was sent–off in the 77th minute, in a 2–0 loss against Avellino. This was his return after earning a yellow card for the fourth time against AS Siena on 1 November 2013. Benali then scored his second goal on 26 December 2013, in a 2–1 win over Juve Stabia and his third goal came on 29 March 2014, in a 2–1 loss against Siena. Benali scored his fourth goal in another encounter, in a 4–1 win against Juve Stabia on 25 May 2014. Benali went on to make thirty–six appearances and scoring nine times for the club in the 2013–14 season.

In the 2014–15 season, Benali started well when he remained in the first team and scored his first goal of the season in a 2 –1 win over Pro Vercelli. Benali then scored three goals in three games between 28 October 2014 and 6 November 2014 against Crotone, Trapani and Pescara. Benali went on to score five more goals later in the season against Virtus Entella, Varese, Vicenza, Catania and Bari. Despite being suspended three times, Benali went on to make thirty–six appearances  and scoring nine times for the club in the 2014–15 season.

However, at the end of the 2014–15 season, Benali's contract at Brescia was expecting to end, as well as, the club began having financial problem. Benali had attracted interests from Inter Milan, Sampdoria, Sassuolo, Chievo, Celtic and Everton.

Palermo 
In the summer of 2015, after three seasons playing for Brescia, he moved to the Serie A club Palermo on a free transfer signing a four-year contract.

However, Benali struggled to make a break into the Palermo's first team and was expected to be loaned out by Manager Maurizio Zamparini.

Pescara
Shortly after joining Palermo, Benali was loaned out Pescara immediately until the end of the 2015–16 season on 29 August 2015.

Benali made his Pescara debut in the opening game of the season, making his first start, in a 4–0 loss against Livorno. Benali established himself in the first team at Pescara and scored his first Pescara goal on 17 October 2015, in a 3–0 win over Trapani. Benali's second goal came on 24 January 2016, in a 4–0 win over Perugia. Benali then scored his third goal of the season, in a 5–2 loss against Pro Vercelli on 5 March 2016. However, Benali was sent–off on 2 April 2016, in a 2–1 win over Calcio Como and was banned for four matches as a result. After serving four matches, Benali returned to the first team and scored after two weeks from his return, in a 5–2 win over Modena on 14 May 2016. Benali then played a role for the club when he scored in the first leg of the promotion play-offs, in a 2–0 win over Trapani and the club would go on to be promoted to Serie A after drawing 1–1. Benali went on to finish the 2015–16 season at Pescara, making thirty–time appearance and scoring five times.

Having previously stated he would like to join Pescara on permanently, Benali got his wish to join the club on 9 June 2016, shortly after the club's promotion to Serie A. and was given a number ten shirt ahead of the 2016–17 season. Benali scored his first Serie A goal, in the opening game of the season, in a 2–2 draw against Napoli.

Crotone
Benali joined Crotone towards the end of the 2017/18 campaign. Across four eventful seasons he was twice promoted to Serie A, but also relegated on two occasions. His departure from the club in January 2022 was precipitated by a rift with coach Francesco Modesto, who attributed blame for the club's poor performance on club captain Benali and another senior player Salvatore Molina.

Loan to Pisa
On 26 January 2022, he joined Pisa on loan until the end of the 2021–22 season, with an option and a conditional obligation to buy.

Return to Brescia
On 26 August 2022, Benali returned to Brescia.

Bari
On 31 January 2023, Benali signed a 1.5-year contract with Bari.

International career
Although Benali played England U17 five times, Benali declared his allegiance to play for Libya. He made his debut with Libya on 23 May 2012, in the friendly played against Rwanda. By October 2019 he was national team captain.

Style of play
In response to his playing style in an interview with Umbro, Benali said: "I'm an attacking midfielder, I like to get forward and support the attack rather than the other side of midfield! Maybe a bit similar to someone like Kaka – I don't have a nickname like his though! Mine's Ammo."

Italian media based Fanta Magazine said of his playing style, quoting: "Benali prefers to play as a midfielder but if necessary can also be used as a central midfielder or even as a playmaker. In addition, Benali can be used as a technical midfielder, who athleticism can help the important contribution in defence despite his lack of height at 173cm. Benali also a good dribbler, who can take a shot from distance and has a very strong offensive skills."

Personal life
Born in Manchester, England, Benali was born to a Libyan father and a British mother and is a Muslim, he also has a younger sister, Layla. Regarding to his nationality, he said he considered himself to be Libyan. Benali has four children: a daughter,  and three sons.

Career statistics

Club

International

Scores and results list Libya's goal tally first, score column indicates score after each Benali goal.

References

External links
 
 
 

1992 births
Living people
Footballers from Manchester
Libyan footballers
Libya international footballers
English footballers
England youth international footballers
English people of Libyan descent
Association football midfielders
Manchester City F.C. players
Rochdale A.F.C. players
Brescia Calcio players
Palermo F.C. players
Delfino Pescara 1936 players
F.C. Crotone players
Pisa S.C. players
S.S.C. Bari players
English Football League players
Serie B players
Serie A players
English expatriate footballers
Expatriate footballers in Italy
English expatriate sportspeople in Italy
Libyan expatriate footballers
Libyan expatriate sportspeople in Italy